Piper cordulatum is a species of plant in the family Piperaceae. It is found in Costa Rica and Panama. It is threatened by habitat loss.

References

cordulatum
Flora of Costa Rica
Flora of Panama
Taxa named by Casimir de Candolle
Taxonomy articles created by Polbot